Serkan Balkan (born 28 March 1994 in Trabzon) is a Turkish cyclist, who most recently rode for Turkish amateur team Trek Trakya.

Major results

2012
 2nd Road race, National Junior Road Championships
2014
 4th Road race, National Road Championships
2015
 5th Overall Tour of Black Sea
2016
 1st  Overall Tour of Ankara
1st Stage 2
 National Road Championships
2nd Under-23 road race
3rd Under-23 time trial
4th Road race
 6th Overall Tour de Serbie
1st  Young rider classification
 7th Balkan Elite Road Classics
2018
 8th Overall Tour of Black Sea

References

External links

1994 births
Living people
Turkish male cyclists
Sportspeople from Trabzon
21st-century Turkish people